The following lists events that happened during 2015 in the Republic of Azerbaijan.

Incumbents
 President: Ilham Aliyev
 Prime Minister: Artur Rasizade
 Speaker: Ogtay Asadov

Events

January
 January 3 - Azerbaijan is reported to have gotten casualties from a subversive act during the Nagorno-Karabakh conflict.

February 

 February 26 - The General Assembly of Pennsylvania State of the United States adopted a resolution recognizing Khojaly Massacre.

April
 April 10 - British Airways Flight 144, serviced by an Airbus A321, makes an emergency landing in Baku due to engine fire, passengers and crew are not harmed.

May
 May 18 - The 3rd World Forum on Intercultural Dialogue 
May 19 - 16 people are killed in a building fire in Baku.

June
 June 12–28 - 2015 European Games: Azerbaijan hosts the inaugural edition of the European games.

July
 July 4 - Nagorno-Karabakh conflict
 Two Armenian drones are shot down by the Azerbaijani military over Azeri positions.
 July 9 - Azerbaijan Pavilion - Expo Milano 2015,
Azerbaijan Pavilion - Expo Milano 2015

November
 Parliamentary elections was held.

References

 
2010s in Azerbaijan
Years of the 21st century in Azerbaijan
Azerbaijan
Azerbaijan
Azerbaijan